The Lloyd C.V was a reconnaissance aircraft produced in Austria-Hungary during the First World War.  It was a departure from Lloyd's previous reconnaissance types, which had all been based on a pre-war design. The C.V was a more compact and streamlined aircraft with an unusual wing structure.

Design and development
The design was largely conventional overall, except for the interplane struts. These were arranged in two sets, front and rear, with the rear sets consisting of two struts per wing, and the forward sets of only one strut per wing. When viewed from the front of the aircraft, rather than standing vertically, the rear struts formed a V-shape, converging to the point where they met the lower wings. From bottom wing to top, the single forward struts sloped inwards towards the centreline, matching the angle of the inboard rear struts. The fin was triangular and similar to the unit on earlier Lloyd designs, but featured an extension at the top of the rudder that reached over the top of the fixed part of the fin. With its curved leading edge and scalloped trailing edge, this rudder resembled the tail of a rooster, and gained the aircraft the nickname Kikeriki (German: "Cock-a-doodle-doo").

The wings departed from the usual structure of one or more spars surrounded by airfoil-shaped ribs and were built instead from ribs surrounded by longerons that stretched span-wise along the wings. This was all then covered in plywood sheeting. While this made for a strong, light structure, it also meant that repairs to damaged wings were difficult, and proved impossible to carry out in the field - damaged aircraft instead being sent back to depots for exchange. Another problem was identified in that moisture trapped inside the wings could have no way to escape easily and would cause the plywood skin to buckle or even delaminate.

Lloyd built 96 C.Vs in 1917, powered by Austro-Daimler engines, while WKF built another 48 with Benz engines. The type saw only brief front-line service before being relegated to secondary duties. A number of continued in service after the war with the military forces of Poland, Hungary, and the Ukraine.

Variants
 C.Vs built by Lloyd with Austro-Daimler engine (96 built)
 C.Vs built by WKF with Benz engine (48 built)

Operators

Austro-Hungarian Imperial and Royal Aviation Troops

Polish Air Force operated six aircraft (1918-1919), nicknamed Fornir ("Veneer").

Ukrainian People's Republic Air Fleet

Hungarian Air Force (postwar)

Specifications

See also

Notes

References

 
 

Lloyd aircraft
1910s Austro-Hungarian military reconnaissance aircraft
Single-engined tractor aircraft
Biplanes
Aircraft first flown in 1917